Bonnie Elizabeth Horwood (born 16 April 1987) is an English footballer who plays as a midfielder for Ipswich Town in the FA Women's National League South. She has previously played for Lincoln City, Reading, Millwall Lionesses and Yeovil Town.

References

External links
 Reading player profile

Living people
1987 births
English women's footballers
Women's association football midfielders
Women's Super League players
Reading F.C. Women players
Notts County L.F.C. players
Millwall Lionesses L.F.C. players
Yeovil Town L.F.C. players
London Bees players